The Fear of God is the second album from Eshon Burgundy. Humble Beast Records released the project on March 3, 2015. He worked with Beautiful Eulogy, Daniel Steele, Street Orchestra, Swoope, and Wit on the production of this album.

Reception

Michael Weaver, specifying in a four and a half star review from Jesus Freak Hideout, replies, "The Fear of God is a crowning achievement in Eshon Burgundy's still young career, and another great album from the Humble Beast family". Signaling in a four star review by New Release Tuesday, Dwayne Lacy recognizes, "this album screams hip hop and boom bap, pointing you to Christ in a very overt way." Aubery McKay, indicating for Wado-O Radio, realizes, "His delivery and flawless lyricism could win anyone over and is worth being heard by many."

Track listing

Chart performance

References

2015 albums
Eshon Burgundy albums